The statue of an Angel (1494–1495) was created by Michelangelo out of marble.  Its height is 51.5 cm.  It is situated in the Basilica of San Domenico, Bologna.

See also
St. Proclus (Michelangelo)
St. Petronius (Michelangelo)
List of works by Michelangelo

External links

Sculptures by Michelangelo
1495 sculptures
Sculptures of angels